Mega Melon is a greatest hits album by Japanese girl group Melon Kinenbi. It was released on December 10, 2008, little under a year after the release of their last album, Melon Juice. It reached a peak position of #122 on the Oricon weekly chart. As part of the tenth anniversary of Hello! Project's "Mega Best Series", it was released as a 2-disc CD + DVD package. It is the second "single best" compilation, including the more recent singles since the first, Fruity Killer Tune, was released in 2006.

Track listings

CD

"Give Me Up"

DVD

References

External links
Mega Melon at the Up-Front Works discography listing (Japanese)

2008 albums
Melon Kinenbi albums